Dr. Agustín Stahl (January 21, 1842 – July 12, 1917) was a Puerto Rican medical doctor and scientist with diverse interests in the fields of ethnology, botany, and zoology.  He advocated Puerto Rico's independence from Spain.

Early years
Stahl was born  in Aguadilla, Puerto Rico and given the name Antón Adolf August, by  his parents Johann Heinrich Christian Stahl and María Helene Stamm. Born into a Protestant family, he was baptized into the Catholic faith in Aguadilla at about three years of age, town where he also received his primary and secondary education.

He studied at the universities of Würzburg and Prague (at the Charles University), graduating from the latter with the title of Doctor of Medicine in 1864. After graduation, Stahl returned to Puerto Rico where he established his medical practice in the city of Bayamón.

Ethnologist, botanist and zoologist

Outside work, Stahl's love of nature lead him to conduct investigations and experiments in the fields of ethnology, botany and zoology. He also had a love of history and historical investigation.

Stahl wrote "Estudios sobre la flora de Puerto Rico" (A study of the Puerto Rican Flora), published in 6 fascicles  from 1883 to 1888. Copies of Stahl's plant collection with  approximately 1,330 plants can be found in various botanical gardens around the world. His collections were the basis for numerous studies by specialists, some of them resulting in new taxa to science.

Stahl has a genus, Stahlia, and five valid species, Argythamnia stahlii, Senna pendula var. stahlii , Eugenia stahlii, Lyonia stahlii, and Ternstroemia stahlii, named in his honor.  The genus Stahlia is represented by a single species, S. monosperma (Tul.) Urb., known to occur only in Puerto Rico and the eastern Dominican Republic. Known in Puerto Rico as Cóbana Negra, this species is currently listed as threatened in the USFW Federal Register, April 5, 1990. He was quoted as saying:

Written works

Stahl's written works include:

 Notes on Puerto Rico's Flora
 Report on the Disease of the Sugar Cane
 Puerto Rican Flora
 The Puerto Rican Indians (Tainos) 
 The Founding of Aguadilla
 The Founding of Bayamón

Later years
The custom of adorning Christmas trees in Puerto Rico began in the city of Bayamón in 1866 when Stahl adorned a tree in his back yard. The people of Bayamón baptized his tree "El árbol de Navidad del Doctor Stahl" (Dr. Stahl's Christmas tree).

Stahl was a firm believer that Puerto Rico should obtain independence from Spain, and was a member of the "Partido Autonomista Puertorriqueño", or Puerto Rican Autonomist Party.  This group sought to create a separate political and legal identity for Puerto Rico while emulating Spain in all political matters.  However, due to Stahl's political views, he was expelled from his position in the Civil Institute of Natural Sciences in Spain and was deported from Spain in 1898.

Stahl died in the city of Bayamón and his remains are buried in Bayamón's Municipal Cemetery. The city of Bayamón turned his former house into a museum to be enjoyed by all those who wish to learn more about him and his work. The Puerto Rican sculptor Tomás Batista created a bust to honor Stahl which can be found at the University of Cayey.

Further reading
  A. Stahl,   
 Chardon, C. E. 1924.  12(11): 65–84.
 Coll y Toste, C. 1926.  Tomo 13: 59–60.
 Gutierrez de Arroyo, I. 1978.  [with bibliography]. .

See also

List of Puerto Ricans
Puerto Rican scientists and inventors
German immigration to Puerto Rico
Dr. Agustín Stahl Stamm House

References

External links
 "Agustin Stahl, The Virtual Museum of Natural History of Puerto Rico", Website
  P. Acevedo-Rodrguez, "The Botanical Legacy of Agustín Stahl", National Museum of Natural History, Smithsonian Institution (English); also  Spanish.

1842 births
1917 deaths
Burials at Santa María Magdalena de Pazzis Cemetery
People from Aguadilla, Puerto Rico
Puerto Rican people of German descent
Puerto Rican botanists
Botanists with author abbreviations
Puerto Rican nationalists
19th-century zoologists
Botanists active in the Caribbean
Puerto Rican independence activists
20th-century American zoologists
Charles University alumni